Carlo is a given name. It is an Italian form of Charles. It can refer to:

Carlo (name)
Monte Carlo
Carlingford, New South Wales, a suburb in north-west Sydney, New South Wales, Australia
A satirical song written by Dafydd Iwan about Prince Charles.
A former member of Dion and the Belmonts best known for his 1964 song, Ring A Ling.
Carlo (submachine gun), an improvised West Bank gun.
 Carlo, a fictional character from Animal Crossing: Pocket Camp
 It can be confused with Carlos
 Carlo means “man” (from Germanic “karal”), “free man” (from Middle Low German “kerle”) and “warrior”, “army” (from Germanic “hari”).

See also

Carl (name)
Carle (disambiguation)
Carlos (given name)

Italian masculine given names